Wheeler Pond may refer to:

 Wheeler Pond (Old Forge, New York)
 Wheeler Pond (Thendara, New York)